Rebecca Šramková was the defending champion but lost in the quarterfinals to Natalia Vikhlyantseva.

Ysaline Bonaventure won the title, defeating Arantxa Rus in the final, 6–4, 7–6(7–3).

Seeds

Draw

Finals

Top half

Bottom half

References

Main Draw

Engie Open Andrézieux-Bouthéon 42 - Singles